Armand Lévy (12 March 1827 – 23 March 1891) was a French lawyer and journalist.

Lévy was an anti-clericalist, a freemason, a republican and a socialist who supported the 1848 Revolution and the Paris Commune. Born in a Roman Catholic family, but with a Jewish grand-father, he was passionate about the Jewish cause. He fought alongside his illustrious friends, such as Adam Mickiewicz, Ion Brătianu and Camillo Cavour, for the independence of Poland and Romania, and for the unification of Italy.

Further reading 

 (this book was reissued in 2006 with )

Sources 
 Armand Lévy's entry on the BnF website.
 .

19th-century French lawyers
19th-century French journalists
French male journalists
French socialists
1827 births
1891 deaths
19th-century French male writers